Bhanda Peeran(Urdu: بانڈه بيران) is a village and a part of Inayatabad Union Council (an administrative subdivision) of Mansehra District in the Khyber Pakhtunkhwa province (formerly known as the North-West Frontier Province) of Pakistan.

Name and meaning 
Bhanda Peeran, also known as Peran Da Bandha in Hindku language and Peer Keeley in Pushto, which means "The Land of Saints", where banda means land and piran means saints, peer means saint and kalay means village.

Historians and native people of this area say that Muslim Saints used to live in this area in the beginning of 15th century.

Population 

It has a total population of more than 18,000. The major tribes and ethnic groups in this area are as follows:

 Syeds (Bukhari) Syeds claim to be the direct descendants of Muhammed through his daughter Fatima-tuz Zahra married to her cousin Ali ibn Abu-Talib. Lots of SYEDs living in Banada Piran . Actually why they called this village by Name of Banda Piran, because First Syed (Bukhari) build this village.

 Sahibzada (Family of Sheikh Baba) This tribe belongs to Quresh ( Hashmi Qureshi). Mr. Muhammad Ishaq (Mian Baji) was the last Guddi Nasheen of this Family. Now, these Sahibzada dwells in different areas of Mansehra mostly in Seri Safaida near Balakot Bypass, also in Banda Peeraan, and in Sarian near Mansehra Motorway interchange Shiekhabad. Including Sahibzada they also use the family name, Mian. Most of them Use Sahibzada Mian as initials to their names 

 Swati  (Janis Khail and lughmani) The Noble Tribe of Old Mansehra, the Warriors. They have most of the resources including land. Most of them migrated from Balakot. 
Jahangiri  a subtribe of Swatis were the real patristics the strongest tribe in Peeraan banda . But with the passage of time they purchased land from swatis and build their own home. Most of them work as labour in Karachi. 
 Paracha  Once, Banda Piran was the hub of the Parachas family but now they have migrated to Mansehra, Abbottabad and Islamabad. These people are mostly involved in business.     
 Gujjar  The people of this tribe are Lineally servants of swatis but by time the oldest inhibatint of this region and have been in the national as well provisional assembly for a continuous period of 35 years.
 Kashmiri  These people migrated from Kashmir before the independence of Pakistan in 1947 and after spending some time in Banda Piran with Jhangiris, they started calling themselves as Jhangiris. They are also famous as BIJLLIE WALAY in the village. 
 Chhachi  These people migrated from Chach Punjab. 
 Milyaar These people are living in the village from centuries. In old times, they used to work as formers. But now they have started their own businesses and got jobs also. These people are calling them now as "Utmanzai" which is a Pathan tribel. However, their this clam has not jusification and still they are called as Milyars. 
 Kabalies  These people migrated from Afghanistan to Kashmir before 1947, and after the independence of Pakistan in 1947, they migrated to Pakistan.
 Mohamand: These people came from Charsadda, ziyam and Mohamand agency, these people are sub tribes clan Dawezai sub division Mandozai (Jalalkhel and Amin khel), Jallalkhel are well educated and well spirituals people of this union council and specially theirs elders also participed in Kashmir jihad. 
 Aliee-Wal  These people came from the district of Aliee after the earthquake of 2005.
 Kohistani  These people migrated from Kohistan District to Banda Piran.

Language 
The majority of the people living in this village and surrounding areas speak Hindku, with good understanding and speech of Pushto language as well as it is the mother tongue of Swati.

Agriculture 
The people of Banda Piran are mostly farmers and rely on agriculture as the best profession in that area.

Muslims 
All the people living in Banda Piran are Muslims and thus there is a lot of religious influence in this area.

Importance 
This village is considered to be the major passage of almost 10 union councils to Hazara University Dhodial, including other villages of InayatAbad, Trangi Sabir Shah. Lies East to Dhodial town and South East to Baffa town. it also touches the Hazara university on the northern side.

River Siran 
Just after leaving the Siran Valley, enters the Pakkhal valley by touching Banda Piran.  The river Siran flows from north to south of the village where mostly farmers use its water for agricultural purposes.

See also 
 Peeran
 Sahibzada
 Swati
 Paracha
 Makhad
 List of psychiatrists

References 
 http://www.thenews.com.pk/daily_detail.asp?id=157574
 https://web.archive.org/web/20090117044856/http://www.thefrontierpost.com/News.aspx?ncat=ts&nid=3434&ad=17-01-2009
 https://web.archive.org/web/20090220203937/http://ppspak.com/exectutive.html
 https://web.archive.org/web/20091031054846/http://www.youthparliament.pk/Initial_list_Interview_YP09.asp

External links 
 Tehsils & Unions in the District of Mansehra - Government of Pakistan
 STUDIES ON WEED CONTROL IN POTATO IN PAKHAL PLAINS OF MANSEHRA
 ‘PIRACHA’

Union councils of Mansehra District
Populated places in Mansehra District